Stannington Sanatorium was the first purpose-built children's tuberculosis sanatorium in the UK which officially opened on 5 October 1907 near to the village of Stannington, Northumberland.  The institution was established by a local charity, The Poor Children's Holiday Association (PCHA), which developed into the modern-day charity Children North East, and also took contributions from local Poor Law Guardians for the upkeep of patients.

History

Background 
Tuberculosis at the beginning of the twentieth century was one of the biggest killers in the UK, responsible for more deaths than any other disease. The disease had long been associated with poverty and poor living conditions and by establishing a dedicated institution the PCHA hoped to make a difference to the lives of thousands of disadvantaged children.  The PCHA had been in operation since 1891 and had begun by taking poor children from Newcastle and Gateshead for day trips to the seaside at Tynemouth. Over time this developed into providing longer holidays to the countryside and also led to the establishment of other institutions for the training of street children. Stannington came about following the recognition of the huge problem of tuberculosis by the charity's Honorary Physician Dr T.M. Allison and the realisation that tuberculous children could not be accommodated at their other facilities owing to fears of the spread of infection.

Development 
When the sanatorium first opened in 1907 it contained only 50 beds but high demand and generous donations soon saw it expand with many new wards and additional facilities added over the coming years. Stannington was the first TB sanatorium to open in the UK that was dedicated purely to the treatment of children. At this time, while national death rates from TB were still fairly high Stannington maintained comparatively low death rates. By 1928 the hospital had the capacity to treat 310 children and this was the maximum capacity the sanatorium was ever to reach.

The sanitorium witnessed a great number of important changes in the treatment of tuberculosis as well as significant social changes. For example, the introduction of Streptomycin in 1947 revolutionised treatment for some. The National Health Service took over the responsibility of the sanatorium in 1948 and it continued its work dedicated to the treatment of tuberculous children up until 1953 whereupon it became a general children's hospital. With the introduction of effective antibiotic treatments in 1947 and an array of other public health measures, tuberculosis had now begun to steadily decline, however, even after this date it continued to take in tuberculosis patients. It continued its operations as an NHS children's hospital until 1984 when it was closed completely. Many of the historic medical records were recovered when the hospital closed.

References

Children's hospitals in the United Kingdom
Defunct hospitals in England
Hospitals in Northumberland
Tuberculosis sanatoria in the United Kingdom
Stannington, Northumberland